Tajikistan participated in the 16th Asian Games with 76 Athletes.

Medalists 

Nations at the 2010 Asian Games
2010
Asian Games